This is a list of islands of Trinidad and Tobago. Trinidad and Tobago is an archipelagic republic in the southern Caribbean.

Major islands
 Trinidad
 Tobago

Bocas Islands

The Bocas Islands lie between Trinidad and Venezuela, in the Bocas del Dragón (Dragons' Mouth). Locally they are referred to as "Down de Islands" or "DDI".

 Chacachacare
 Monos
 Huevos
 Gaspar Grande (Gasparee)
 Gasparillo Island (Little Gasparee or Centipede Island)

Five Islands

The Five Islands are actually a group of six small islands lying west of Port of Spain in the Gulf of Paria. Also known as Las Cotorras.

 Caledonia Island
 Craig Island (Craig and Caledonia are joined by a man made causeway)
 Lenagan Island
 Nelson Island
 Pelican Island
 Rock Island

San Diego Islands

Sometimes referred to simply as the Diego Islands, these two islets lie between the Bocas Islands and the Five Islands.

 Cronstadt (Kronstadt)
 Carrera (a prison island)

Others in the Gulf of Paria

 Faralon Rock, off San Fernando 
 Soldado Rock

North Coast of Trinidad

 Saut d'Eau

Off Tobago
 Little Tobago (Bird of Paradise Island)
 St. Giles Island
 Goat Island
 Sisters' Rock

List of minor islands with co-ordinates
Taken from the Archipelagic Baselines of Trinidad and Tobago Order, Notice No. 206 of 31 October 1988, as corrected by Legal Notice No. 77 on 5 April 1989.

 East Rock 
 Casa Cruz Rock 
 Alcatras Rock 
 Icacos Point 
 Black Rock 
 Cabresse Point 
 Cabresse Island 
 Sisters Island 
 Marble Island 
 St. Giles Island 
 Little Tobago

References

See also
List of islands in the Caribbean
Geography of Trinidad and Tobago

 
Islands
Islands
Trinidad and Tobago